Mark Jones (22 April 1939 – 14 January 2010) was an English actor, who appeared frequently in various films and television series.

Credits include: A Family at War, Z-Cars, Van der Valk, Doctor Who (in the serial The Seeds of Doom), The New Avengers, The Onedin Line, Target, Secret Army, Tales of the Unexpected, Buccaneer, Blott on the Landscape, Casualty, Call Me Mister and Dempsey and Makepeace.

He also appeared in the films Tell Me Lies (1968), Connecting Rooms (1970), Under Milk Wood (1972), Layout for 5 Models (1972), Keep It Up, Jack (1973, title role), The Sexplorer (1975), Secrets of a Superstud (1976), The Medusa Touch (1978), Can I Come Too? (1979), Bear Island (1979), Don't Open till Christmas (1984), and the Star Wars saga film The Empire Strikes Back (1980).

On stage he worked with the RSC several times, including in Peter Brook's production of Marat/Sade at the Aldwych Theatre in 1964, and in its Broadway transfer the following year. He also appeared in the film version.

Did two years National Service at S.H.A.P.E. Paris 1959-61.

Filmography

References

External links
 

1939 births
2010 deaths
English male stage actors
English male film actors
English male television actors